James Cooper (born 1919) is an American former Negro league pitcher who played in the 1940s.

A native of St. Louis, Missouri, Cooper played for the Cleveland Buckeyes and the Jacksonville Red Caps in 1942. In four recorded appearances on the mound, he posted a 9.00 ERA over 16 innings.

References

External links
 and Seamheads

Date of birth missing
Place of birth missing
Cleveland Buckeyes players
Jacksonville Red Caps players
Baseball pitchers
Baseball players from St. Louis
1919 births
Possibly living people